In September 1942, Pharmacist's Mate Wheeler Lipes performed an emergency appendectomy aboard a United States Navy submarine. Although he did not have proper medical equipment or formal surgical training, the operation was a success. After the war, Petty Officer Lipes remained in the Navy and later received a Medical Service Corps commission in 1951. He retired as a lieutenant commander.

Fame

In September 1942, aboard USS Seadragon, Wheeler B. Lipes performed the first major surgery aboard a submarine when a shipmate showing symptoms of acute appendicitis required an emergency operation to survive. Positioned in enemy waters and lacking standard medical equipment, Lipes performed a successful appendectomy using kitchen instruments such as spoons and tea strainers. "Doc" Lipes, as he was called, had no formal surgical training and just three years of medical experience as a hospital lab technician at the time of the surgery. The Navy medical establishment was angered by the occurrence, and there was talk of a court martial.

Popular media

On December 14, 1942, the Chicago Daily News published an article by George Weller about the surgery. It won the 1943 Pulitzer Prize for Reporting. The events documented in the piece were incorporated into the film Destination Tokyo (1943) starring Cary Grant.

Lipes's heroic surgery was the basis of an episode on The Cavalcade of America, a long-running radio series featuring historical dramas. The episode, titled  “Pharmacist’s Mate, First Class,” aired on NBC's main Red Network on May 24, 1943. Michael O'Shea starred as the sailor based on Mr. Lipes in a program written by Stuart Hawkins. Mr. Lipes (pron. LYPS) makes an appearance at the end of the show.

Recognition

Wheeler B. Lipes eventually received official recognition for his feat over 60 years after the submarine surgery. He was awarded a Navy Commendation Medal at a ceremony at Camp Lejeune, N.C.

References

Burials at Arlington National Cemetery
United States Navy officers
People from Craig County, Virginia
1920 births
2005 deaths
People from New Bern, North Carolina
Military personnel from Virginia
Military personnel from North Carolina
United States Navy personnel of World War II